Richterago is a genus of Brazilian plants in the family Asteraceae.

 Species

 formerly included
Richterago radiata (Vell.) Roque - Actinoseris radiata (Vell.) Cabrera

References

Asteraceae genera
Gochnatioideae
Endemic flora of Brazil